Teddy Tang, better known as Teddy, is an actor and model in Singapore

Career
Teddy Tang won a local TV talent hunt, Hey Gorgeous, in 2012. Within the same year, the then part-time model flew to Hong Kong to pursue a modelling career after graduating with a Mechanical Engineering degree from Nanyang Technological University. He is also an alumnus of Gan Eng Seng School and Yishun Junior College. 

He was awarded Best Newcomer in Asia Model Awards 2014. Six months later, he moved to Taiwan because he felt it had a more vibrant entertainment scene, with a larger market for budding actors.

His exotic good looks - inherited from a Taiwanese mother and a Singaporean Chinese father of Dutch and Japanese descent - landed him a spot with Catwalk in 2015.

He made his rounds at the Taiwanese variety show circuit - displaying his wit on talk shows Genius Go Go Go 天才冲冲冲 and GTV Delicious 美味搜查线 and testing his athletic ability on gameshow Variety Get Together 综艺大集合.

Teddy's modelling portfolio includes gigs such as Fendi, Issey Miyake, Dior, Timberland Fashion Show & Adidas shows in Singapore, Hong Kong, China and Taiwan. He has also appeared in the commercials and print ads of brands such as Samsung, Hyundai, Gucci and American Express in Singapore, Hong Kong, China and Taiwan. He also featured in editorial shoots for Esquire and GQ Taiwan.

Teddy later returned to Singapore in May 2016 to take on local productions such as Channel 5 series Tanglin, and Channel 8 drama Hero. He did hosting too.

Filmography

Channel 8 Dramas

Channel 5 Drama

Variety Shows

Accolades

References

1986 births
Living people
Singaporean male actors